Sigrid Tomio (born 1975) from Pralognan is a French ski mountaineer. She studied at University of Aberdeen.

Selected results 
 2001:
 10th, European Championship team race (together with Catherine Guigon)

Pierra Menta 

 2000: 5th, together with Véronique Lathuraz
 2001: 4th, together with Catherine Guigon

References 

1975 births
Living people
French female ski mountaineers
Alumni of the University of Aberdeen
21st-century French women